Dieudonné Kalulika (born October 1, 1981) is a Congolese former football player who last played for C.S. Visé.

International career
He was part of the Congolese 2004 African Nations Cup team that finished bottom of their group in the first round of competition, thus failing to qualify for the quarter-finals.

External links
 
 

1981 births
Living people
Democratic Republic of the Congo footballers
Democratic Republic of the Congo expatriate footballers
Democratic Republic of the Congo international footballers
2004 African Cup of Nations players
C.D. Primeiro de Agosto players
C.S. Visé players
R.W.D.M. Brussels F.C. players
K.S.V. Roeselare players
Sint-Truidense V.V. players
TP Mazembe players
Belgian Pro League players
Expatriate footballers in Belgium
Association football midfielders
Footballers from Kinshasa
21st-century Democratic Republic of the Congo people